April Carter (22 November 1937 – 2022) was a British peace activist. She was a political lecturer at the universities of Lancaster, Somerville College, Oxford and Queensland, and was a Fellow at the Stockholm International Peace Research Institute from 1985 to 1987. She is currently an Honorary Research Fellow of the Centre for Peace and Reconciliation Studies, Coventry University, and a 'senior editor' on the international editorial board for the International Encyclopedia of Peace to be published by Oxford University Press (New York).

April Carter was active in the nuclear disarmament movement in Britain in the late 1950s and early 1960s, becoming Secretary of the Direct Action Committee Against Nuclear War in May 1958 (just after it had organised the first Aldermaston March), and was involved in early civil disobedience at nuclear missile bases.
 In 1961 she was European coordinator for the San Francisco to Moscow March organised by the US Committee for Nonviolent Action, and 1961-62 was an assistant editor at the international pacifist weekly Peace News.  During the revived nuclear disarmament movement of the 1980s she was a member of the Alternative Defence Commission, which published an analysis of non-nuclear defence options for Britain in Defence Without the Bomb (Taylor and Francis, 1983)

Major works
The Political Theory of Anarchism (Harper & Row, 1971) 
Authority and Democracy (Routledge & Kegan Paul PLC, 1979) 
Politics of Women's Rights (Longman, 1988) 
Success and Failure in Arms Control Negotiations]] (Stockholm International Peace Research Institute monographs) (Oxford University Press, 1989)Peace Movements (Longman, 1992)The Political Theory of Global Citizenship (Routledge, 2001 and 2006 in paperback).  & 
Direct Action and Democracy Today (Polity Press, 2004). People Power and Political Change: Key Issues and Concepts (Routledge 2012) A Guide to Civil Resistance: Volume one: A Bibliography of People Power and Nonviolent Protest (Green Print, 2013) A Guide to Civil Resistance: Volume two: A Bibliography of Social Movements and Nonviolent Action'' (Green Print, 2015)

See also
 List of peace activists

References

Fellows of Somerville College, Oxford
1937 births
Nonviolence advocates
British anti–nuclear weapons activists
Living people
Academics of Coventry University